The National Wildlife Refuge Association (NWRA) is an independent non-profit 501(c)(3) membership organization that works to conserve American wildlife by strengthening and expanding the  National Wildlife Refuge System managed by the United States Fish and Wildlife Service. NWRA’s mission is to engage and mobilize volunteers in building support for refuges, educate decision-makers in Washington, and lead diverse conservation partnerships designed to amplify the impact that refuges have in protecting wildlife habitat both within and beyond their formal boundaries.

Founded in 1975, by former National Wildlife Refuge System managers and employees, the NWRA is the only national advocacy organization dedicated to promoting and protecting the National Wildlife Refuge System.

Advocacy in Washington, D.C. 
The NWRA is a leading voice for the Refuge System in Washington, D.C., and informs decision-makers about legislation and policies that benefit or threaten wildlife refuge habitat.

NWRA is the chair of the Cooperative Alliance for Refuge Enhancement (CARE), a diverse coalition of 22 sporting, science, and conservation organizations that includes the National Rifle Association and Defenders of Wildlife.  The coalition spearheaded efforts in 2009, to secure $200 million for wildlife conservation programs through the American Recovery and Reinvestment Act, and ensured a $39 million increase in annual Refuge System funding that year.

The Refuge Friends movement
The NWRA mobilizes thousands of volunteers and Refuge Friends groups across the country to proactively address the challenges refuges face.  The NWRA has led thousands of Refuge Friends volunteers to Capitol Hill and hosted the 2009 National Refuge Friends Conference, and the annual Refuge System Awards.

NWRA has also led efforts to stop construction of a road through federally designated wilderness in the Izembek National Wildlife Refuge in Alaska, publishing its "Road to Nowhere" report in 2008.

Conservation programs 
The NWRA leads science-based and partner-driven conservation initiatives to protect ecologically rich wild land surrounding national wildlife refuges.  By facilitating partnerships among land trusts, refuge friends groups, conservation organizations, recreation groups and federal and state agencies, NWRA maximizes funding and expertise in these conservation programs.

NWRA's conservation programs have led to partnerships to protect habitat for endangered West Indian manatees at Crystal River NWR, Florida, created strategic plans for acquiring, restoring and conserving key habitats in the Lower Mississippi River valley, and forged key partnerships to protect desert tortoises in southern Nevada and seabirds in coastal Oregon.

References

External links
 National Wildlife Refuge Association
 Cooperative Alliance for Refuge Enhancement
 National Wildlife Refuge System

Environmental organizations based in Washington, D.C.
Nature conservation organizations based in the United States
Wildlife conservation organizations